Sun Yat-sen University may also refer to:

 Sun Yat-sen University (SYSU) is a public university in Guangzhou, the People's Republic of China (hereinafter China).
 National Sun Yat-sen University (NSYSU) is a national research university in Kaohsiung, Taiwan.

Historically existed:
 Moscow Sun Yat-sen University, Soviet Union (1925-1935)

Renewed:
 National 2nd Sun Yat-sen University, currently Wuhan University, China
 National 3rd Sun Yat-sen University, currently Zhejiang University, China
 National 4th Sun Yat-sen University, currently Nanjing University, Southeast University in Nanjing, China
 National 5th Sun Yat-sen University, currently Henan University, China
 National Lanchow Sun Yat-sen University, currently Lanzhou University, China
 National Sian (Xi'an) Sun Yat-sen University, currently Northwest University (China) in Xi'an, China

Sun Yat-sen